Arne Larsson may refer to:
 Arne Larsson (patient) (1915–2001), first patient to receive an artificial cardiac pacemaker
 Arne Larsson (footballer, born 1931), Swedish footballer
 Arne Larsson (footballer, born 1934) (1934–1994), Swedish football and bandy player